Lin Juemin (1887–1911) was a late Qing dynasty revolutionary.

Biography 
In 1907, Lin traveled to Japan to study at Keio University, where he joined Dr. Sun Yat-sen's revolutionary group, the Tongmenghui. Lin attempted to begin a popular revolution in 1911 in Guangzhou after returning to his native Fujian, but he was arrested and his revolution failed. 3 days before his capture, he wrote his famous "Letter of Farewell to my Wife", which is considered an important work of Chinese writing of the early 20th century. He was remembered as a revolutionary martyr after his death.

American artist Maya Lin is related to him.

In popular culture

 Tu Kuang-chi starred as Lin Juemin in the 1954 film The 72 Martyrs of Canton.
 Chou Shao-tung starred as Lin Juemin in the 1980 film Magnificent 72.
 Hu Ge portrayed Lin Juemin in the 2011 film 1911.

See also
 Second Guangzhou Uprising

References

Bibliography

1887 births
1911 deaths
Chinese revolutionaries